Missie Berteotti (born September 22, 1963) is an American professional golfer who played on the LPGA Tour.

Berteotti won once on the LPGA Tour in 1993.

Professional wins (1)

LPGA Tour wins (1)

LPGA Tour playoff record (1–0)

References

External links

American female golfers
Miami Hurricanes women's golfers
LPGA Tour golfers
Golfers from Pittsburgh
1963 births
Living people